Preston or Prestons may refer to:

Places

England
Preston, Lancashire, an urban settlement 
The City of Preston, Lancashire, a borough and non-metropolitan district which contains the settlement
County Borough of Preston, a local government district containing the settlement from 1835 to 1974
Preston (UK Parliament constituency)
Preston railway station in Preston, Lancashire
The PR postcode area, also known as the Preston postcode area 
Preston Urban Area, the conurbation with Preston at its core
Preston, Devon (in Paignton)
Preston, Teignbridge, in Kingsteignton parish
Preston, Dorset 
Preston, East Riding of Yorkshire, near Kingston upon Hull
Preston, Brighton, East Sussex
Preston, Cotswold, Gloucestershire
Preston, Forest of Dean, Gloucestershire
Preston, Hertfordshire
Preston, London, near Wembley
Preston (ward)
Preston, Northumberland, the location of Preston Tower
Preston, Rutland
Preston, Shropshire, in Upton Magna parish
Preston, Somerset, in Stogumber parish
Preston, Tyne and Wear
Preston, Aldbourne and Ramsbury, Wiltshire
Preston, Lyneham, Wiltshire
Preston Bagot, Warwickshire
Preston Bissett, Buckinghamshire
Preston Brook, Cheshire
Preston Candover, Hampshire
Preston Capes, Northamptonshire
Preston Crowmarsh, Oxfordshire
Preston Deanery, Northamptonshire
Preston Gubbals, Shropshire
Preston-le-Skerne, County Durham
Preston-next-Faversham, Kent
Preston-next-Wingham, Dover, Kent; better known as Preston
Preston on Stour, Warwickshire
Preston-on-Tees, Eaglescliffe, County Durham
Preston on the Hill, Cheshire
Preston on Wye, Herefordshire
Preston Plucknett, Somerset
Preston St Mary, Suffolk
Preston-under-Scar, North Yorkshire
Preston upon the Weald Moors, Shropshire
Preston Wynne, Herefordshire
Great Preston, West Yorkshire
Long Preston, North Yorkshire

Australia
Preston, Victoria
City of Preston (Victoria)
Electoral district of Preston
Preston, Queensland, Toowoomba and Lockyer Valley regions
Preston, Queensland (Whitsunday Region)
Preston, Tasmania
South Preston, Tasmania
Prestons, New South Wales

Canada
Preston, Nova Scotia
East Preston, Nova Scotia
North Preston
Preston (electoral district)
Preston, Ontario

Cuba
Guatemala, Cuba, also known as Preston, in the Holguín Province

Scotland
Preston, East Linton, East Lothian
Preston, Prestonpans, East Lothian
Preston, Scottish Borders, near Duns
Preston Island, reclaimed land in the Firth of Forth
Prestonkirk or Preston, near East Linton, East Lothian
Preston Mill, a watermill near East Linton, East Lothian

United States
Preston, Alabama, see List of places in Alabama: N–R#P
Preston, Arkansas, see List of places in Arkansas: P
Preston, California
Preston, Colorado
Preston, Connecticut
Preston, Georgia
Preston, Idaho
Preston, Illinois
Preston, Indiana
Preston, Iowa
Preston, Kansas
Preston, Kentucky
Preston, Maryland
Preston, Michigan
Preston, Minnesota
Preston, Mississippi
Preston, Missouri (in Hickory County)
Preston, Jasper County, Missouri
Preston, Nebraska
Preston, Nevada
Preston, New York
Preston, North Carolina 
Preston, Oklahoma
Preston, Luzerne County, Pennsylvania, see List of places in Pennsylvania: Pl–Q
Preston, McKean County, Pennsylvania, see List of places in Pennsylvania: Pl–Q
Preston, South Dakota, a ghost town
Preston, Texas (in Grayson County)
Preston, Wharton County, Texas
Preston, Virginia
Preston, Washington
Preston, West Virginia
Preston County, West Virginia
Preston, Adams County, Wisconsin, a town
Preston, Grant County, Wisconsin, an unincorporated community
Preston, Trempealeau County, Wisconsin, a town
Preston Road, important thoroughfare to the history and growth of Dallas, Texas, built over a historically important cattle trail

Outer space  
3792 Preston, an asteroid

People 
Preston (singer) (born 1982), British singer
List of people with given name Preston
List of people with surname Preston

Fictional characters 
 Becky Preston, from the Shiloh movies
 Bill S. Preston Esq., one half of Bill and Ted, played by Alex Winter
 Dara Lynn Preston, from the Shiloh movies
 Dick Preston, The New Dick Van Dyke Show
Marty Preston, from the Shiloh movies
 Preston Northwest from Gravity Falls
 Sergeant Preston of the Yukon
 Dr. Preston Burke, from Grey's Anatomy
 Preston, the robot dog in the Wallace and Gromit film A Close Shave
 Preston (played by Colin Hanks), Carl Denham's assistant in King Kong (2005 film)
 Cleric John Preston (played by Christian Bale) in Equilibrium (film)
 Preston Winthrop from MySims Agents
 John James Preston, the full name of Mr. Big (Sex and the City), Carrie Bradshaw's love interest in the Sex and the City television series and ensuing films
 Preston Tien, a character from Power Rangers Ninja Steel
 Preston Garvey, a character in Fallout 4

Ships
Preston (ship), multiple ships
HMS Preston, multiple ships
USS Preston, multiple ships
WT Preston, a stern wheel snagboat operated by the US Army Corps of Engineers

Schools
Preston University (United States), controversial unaccredited institution
Preston University (Pakistan), private university in Pakistan
Preston College, further education college in Preston, Lancashire, England
Preston High School (disambiguation), several schools

Other 
HM Prison Preston, a prison in England
Preston baronets, baronetcies created for persons with the surname Preston
Preston Car Company, a Canadian railway equipment builder
Preston station (Houston), Houston, Texas
Preston (speedway), a British speedway team
Preston North End F.C., an English football club
Preston Grasshoppers R.F.C., an English rugby football club
Preston Street (disambiguation), several streets
Preston Road tube station, a London Underground station

Prestons 
 Prestons, New South Wales, Australia
 Prestons, New Zealand
 Prestons Station, Kentucky, United States

See also
 City of Preston (disambiguation)
 Justice Preston (disambiguation)

English masculine given names